The 1908 Goldey College football team represented Goldey College (now known as Goldey–Beacom College) in the 1908 college football season as an independent. In three games played, Goldey compiled a record of 0–2–1, being outscored 0–45.

Schedule

References

Goldey College
Goldey College football seasons
Goldey College football
College football winless seasons